Ultralight aircraft in the United States are much smaller and lighter than ultralight aircraft as defined by all other countries.

In the United States, ultralights are described as "ultralight vehicles" and not as aircraft. They are not required to be registered, nor is the pilot required to have a pilot's certificate.

United States definition of "ultralight" 
Regulation of ultralight aircraft in the United States is covered by the Code of Federal Regulations, Title 14 (Federal Aviation Regulations), Part 103, or 14 CFR Part 103, which defines an "ultralight" as a vehicle that:
 has only one seat
 Is used only for recreational or sport flying
 Does not have a U.S. or foreign airworthiness certificate
 If unpowered, weighs less than 155 pounds
 If powered:
 Weighs less than  empty weight, excluding floats and safety devices
 Has a maximum fuel capacity of 5 U.S. gallons (19 L)
 Does not exceed  calibrated airspeed at full power in level flight
 Has a power-off stall speed which does not exceed  calibrated airspeed or less

Certification 
 Ultralight vehicles and their component parts and equipment are not required to meet the airworthiness certification standards specified for aircraft or to have certificates of airworthiness.
 Operators of ultralight vehicles are not required to meet any aeronautical knowledge, age, or experience requirements or to have airman or medical certificates.
 Ultralight vehicles are not required to be registered or to have registration markings.

Operations 
 Ultralight vehicle cannot be flown except between the hours of sunrise and sunset.
 Ultralight vehicles may be operated during the twilight periods 30 minutes before official sunrise and 30 minutes after official sunset or, in Alaska, during the period of civil twilight as defined in the Air Almanac, if:
 The vehicle has an operating anti-collision light visible for at least 3 statute miles
 Flight can only take place in uncontrolled airspace

Ultralight vehicles cannot be flown over any congested area of a city, town, or settlement, or over any open air assembly of persons.

Weight allowances can be made for amphibious landing gear, and ballistic parachute systems.

In the United States, while no certification or training is required by law for ultralights, training is strongly advised.

See also
 Ultralight aviation
 Ultralight trike

References

United States ultralight aircraft